Kuzkışla can refer to:

 Kuzkışla, Alaca
 Kuzkışla, İliç